Colony Hotel may refer to:

in Canada
Chestnut Residence, a University of Toronto building, the former "Colony Hotel"

in the United States
Colony Hotel & Cabaña Club, Delray Beach, Florida, one of the Historic Hotels of America
The Colony Hotel (Kennebunkport, Maine), one of the Historic Hotels of America